Bromodomain-containing protein 2 is a protein that in humans is encoded by the BRD2 gene. BRD2 is part of the Bromodomain and Extra-Terminal motif (BET) protein family that also contains BRD3, BRD4, and BRDT in mammals 

Early descriptions demonstrated that BRD2 gene product is a mitogen-activated kinase which localizes to the nucleus. The gene maps to the major histocompatibility complex (MHC) class II region on chromosome 6p21.3 but sequence comparison suggests that the protein is not involved in the immune response. Homology to the Drosophila gene female sterile homeotic suggests that this human gene may be part of a signal transduction pathway involved in growth control.

Functions
BRD2 has been implicated in cancer.
BRD2 loss in mice causes obesity without diabetes for unknown reasons.
BRD2 may have functional overlap with close homolog BRD3.
BRD2 function is blocked by BET inhibitors.

Interactions
BRD2 has been shown to interact with E2F2, and many transcription factors including GATA1.

References

External links

Further reading